Gavin Paul Rae (born 28 November 1977) is a Scottish professional football manager and former player who played as a midfielder. He was recently the head coach of National Premier Leagues NSW club Hakoah Sydney City East FC.

Rae started his playing career with Dundee, making over 200 league appearances for the club. He moved to Rangers in January 2004, but struggled to hold down a regular place in their team due to injury. He moved to Cardiff City in 2007 and featured regularly in the team that reached the 2008 FA Cup Final. Rae left Cardiff in 2011 and had spells later in his career with Dundee and Aberdeen. He also won 14 caps for Scotland between 2001 and 2009.

Club career

Dundee
Rae was born in Aberdeen. His first club was Dundee. In total he made 223 games for the club scoring 26 goals in a period of eight years. In November 1999 he memorably scored a last minute winner to beat future club Rangers at Ibrox.

Rae stuck with the club during the bad financial days during the 2003–2004 season when Dundee hit administration until he was sold to Rangers for £250,000 in January 2004.

Rangers
Rae made his debut for Rangers on 3 January 2004 against Celtic but only lasted 30 minutes due to a hamstring injury. After recovering, he managed to score his first goal against Dundee, his former club. However, he suffered another injury, damaging his knee against Dundee United on 24 April 2004. His road to recovery was hit by several set-backs before he finally made his return to the Rangers first team on 18 February 2006 against Hibernian. He went on to make regular appearances in the Rangers team, particularly towards the end of the season with fellow midfielder Barry Ferguson requiring an operation due to a long running leg injury.

In the 2006–07 season, Rae was given the captaincy in a number of games when Barry Ferguson was not playing. On 1 January 2007 he was announced as permanent captain after Ferguson's meeting with Paul Le Guen, which saw Ferguson stripped of the captaincy and removed from the squad. On 4 January 2007 Le Guen resigned from the managerial position at Rangers and new manager Walter Smith re-appointed Ferguson as club captain. He was offered a new deal at the club by Smith but he decided it would be better for him to attempt to find first team football. Rae left Rangers as a free agent at the end of the 2006–07 season when his contract expired.

On 21 May 2007 he was linked with a move to Hearts with his former teammate at Rangers, Stephen Hughes but the move did not come to fruition.

Cardiff City
Rae was watched by several sides from England, Wales and Scotland and came very close to joining Football League Championship side Norwich City but instead on 23 June 2007 he joined Championship side Cardiff City along with fellow Scotsman Steven MacLean on a free transfer. On 26 June 2007 he was quoted in an interview saying "Believe me, I am coming to Cardiff fully fit and fully committed. I am fired up to make the most of this chance".

On his arrival Rae found himself in first team action from the start of the season due to a long-term injury to Riccardo Scimeca and also took over the captaincy for the 2–1 home win against Burnley with Darren Purse starting the match on the bench, Scimeca injured and Stephen McPhail dropped from the side and he scored his first goal for the Bluebirds not long after on 15 September in a 2–1 victory over Plymouth Argyle. He went on to make a total of 55 appearances in all competitions in his first year, more than any other player at the club including playing in all 6 matches during the clubs run to the FA Cup Final.

The following season began badly for Rae when, after making just two appearances, he chipped a bone in his leg just below his knee during a 2–1 win over AFC Bournemouth in the League Cup. Rae was told that he could continue playing with the injury if he could withstand the pain, returning to the side after a month out. He went on to appear in 46 matches in all competitions for Cardiff, the second highest amount behind Roger Johnson.

Rae started the 2009–10 season on the bench but was handed his first appearance of the year after 45 minutes of the opening game with Joe Ledley suffering from an illness. With Ledley away on international duty, he was handed a start in a 3–1 win over Dagenham & Redbridge in the first round of the Football League Cup and scored the first goal of the game. He made his 400th club appearance in a 4–3 win over Sheffield United on 24 October 2009, coming on for Stephen McPhail, and made his 100th league appearance for Cardiff on 1 November 2009 against Nottingham Forest as a substitute. During a 4–4 draw with Peterborough United on 28 December 2009, Rae suffered a broken hand keeping him out for up to 4 weeks, but returned on 9 January 2010 against Blackpool after a remarkable recovery. On 9 April 2010, Rae was confirmed to be sidelined for the rest of the season after he suffered a ruptured tendon in his ankle. Having fallen out of favour at the start of the 2010–11 season following the arrivals of Danny Drinkwater and Seyi Olofinjana, Rae was allowed to open talks with Leeds United in August 2010 over a possible transfer. Rae left Cardiff later in the summer.

Return to Dundee 

Aberdeen were interested in signing Rae, but on 14 October 2011, he signed a short-term deal with his former club Dundee. Rae scored against Morton in a 2–1 victory. On 26 November 2011, Rae scored a header against Falkirk as Dundee won 4–2. Rae also scored against Kilmarnock in a fourth round Scottish Cup Replay with Dundee losing out 2–1.

Aberdeen 

On 30 January 2012, Rae signed for his home town club Aberdeen.
 He scored his first goal for the club in the Scottish League Cup against Greenock Morton, and his first league goal for Aberdeen on 23 September 2012 playing against Motherwell. He then went on to score goals against Hibs and Kilmarnock. Rae left Aberdeen at the end of the 2012–13 season, as his contract was not renewed.

Third spell at Dundee 

On 6 June 2013, Rae once again joined Dundee, this time as a player/coach. He scored his first goal in this spell in a 4–1 win against Dumbarton on 12 October 2013. He decided to leave the club after gaining promotion to the Scottish Premiership in May 2014 and subsequently retired.

Hakoah Sydney City East FC
In September 2014, Rae moved to Australia and signed with National Premier Leagues NSW club Hakoah Sydney City East FC. He became their head coach in January 2018.

He is currently playing for Pagewood Botany FC

International career 

Rae was still at Dundee when he gained international recognition, winning his first cap for Scotland in 2001 against Poland. On 24 March 2008 he received his first call-up to the squad for two years, and also his first while at Cardiff. He came on as a substitute at half-time during a 1–1 draw with Croatia. Rae was once again called up to replace the suspended James McFadden in a 2010 World Cup qualifier against Holland on 9 September 2009.

Career statistics

Honours
Dundee
Scottish Championship (2): 1997–98, 2013–14

Hakoah Sydney City East
Waratah Cup (1): 2017

Scotland
Kirin Cup (1): 2006

References

External links

Gavin Rae player profile at cardiffcityfc.co.uk
Gavin Rae player profile at football.co.uk
Gavin Rae player profile at 4thegame.com
Gavin Rae player profile at rangers.co.uk

Scottish footballers
Scotland international footballers
Scotland under-21 international footballers
Association football midfielders
Dundee F.C. players
Rangers F.C. players
Cardiff City F.C. players
Aberdeen F.C. players
English Football League players
Scottish Premier League players
Scottish Football League players
1977 births
Living people
Footballers from Aberdeen
People educated at Oldmachar Academy
Scottish Professional Football League players
Scottish expatriate footballers
Scottish expatriate sportspeople in Australia
Expatriate soccer players in Australia
Scottish football managers
Scottish expatriate football managers
Expatriate soccer managers in Australia
Hakoah Sydney City East FC players
FA Cup Final players